Tamonea is a genus of flowering plants belonging to the family Verbenaceae.

Its native range is Mexico to Tropical America.

Species:

Tamonea boxiana 
Tamonea curassavica 
Tamonea euphrasiifolia 
Tamonea juncea 
Tamonea spicata 
Tamonea subbiflora

References

Verbenaceae
Verbenaceae genera